Wilfrid Bennett Lewis,  (June 24, 1908 – January 10, 1987) was a Canadian nuclear scientist and administrator, and was centrally involved in the development of the CANDU reactor.

Born in Castle Carrock, Cumberland, England, he earned a doctorate in physics at Cavendish Laboratory, University of Cambridge in 1934, and continued his research in nuclear physics there until 1939. From 1939 until 1946, he was with the Air Ministry, becoming Chief Superintendent of the Telecommunications Research Establishment. In 1946, he moved to Canada, to become director of the division of Atomic Energy Research at the National Research Council of Canada in Chalk River, Ontario. From 1952 until 1963, he was Vice President, Research and Development of the Atomic Energy of Canada Limited, and was Senior Vice President, Science from 1963 until 1973.

Starting in the mid-1940s, Lewis directed the development and championed the CANDU system, with its natural uranium fuel moderated by heavy water (deuterium oxide) to control neutron flux. The CANDU has proven its value for commercial power applications, showing outstanding efficiency and safety records. AECL also became a world leader in the production of radioisotopes for medical purposes.

From 1973 until his death in 1987, Lewis was a Distinguished Professor of Science at Queen's University.

From 1955 until 1987, he was the Canadian Representative on the United Nations Scientific Advisory Committee.

In 1994 a biography of Lewis entitled Nuclear Pursuits was published Ruth Fawcett.

Honours
 In 1945 he was made a Fellow of the Royal Society of London.
 In 1946 Lewis was appointed as a Commander of the Most Excellent Order of the British Empire
 In 1964 he received an honorary Doctor of Science from the University of Saskatchewan.
 In 1966 he was the first recipient Outstanding Achievement Award of the Public Service of Canada.
 In 1967 he was made a Companion of the Order of Canada.
 In 1967 he received the United States Atoms for Peace Award
 In 1972 he won the Royal Medal of the Royal Society of London
 In 1981 he received the United States Department of Energy Enrico Fermi Award

References

Further reading
 Canada and the Atomic Revolution, by D. M. LeBourdais, Toronto, McClelland and Stewart Limited, 1959.
 Canada's Nuclear Story, by Wilfrid Eggleston, Toronto, Clarke, Irwin & Company, 1965.
 Science and Politics in Canada, by G. Bruce Doern, Montreal, McGill-Queen's University Press, 1972.
 Canadian Nuclear Policies, edited by G. Bruce Doern and Robert W. Morrison, Montreal, The Institute for Research on Public Policy, 1980, .
 Nucleus: The History of Atomic Energy of Canada Limited, by Robert Bothwell, Toronto, University of Toronto Press, 1988, .
 Nuclear Pursuits: The Scientific Biography of Wilfrid Bennett Lewis, by Ruth Fawcett, Montreal, McGill-Queen's University Press, 1994.
 Canada Enters the Nuclear Age: A Technical History of Atomic Energy of Canada Limited, project coordination by Eugene Critoph, Montreal, McGill-Queen's University Press, 1997, .
 Isotopes and Innovation: MDS Nordion's First Fifty Years, 1946-1996, by Paul Litt, Montreal, McGill-Queen's University Press, 2000, .
 Canadian Nuclear Energy Policy: Changing Ideas, Institutions, and Interests, edited by G. Bruce Doern, Arslan Dorman, and Robert W. Morrison, Toronto, University of Toronto Press, 2001, .
 Risky Business: Nuclear Power and Public Protest in Canada, by Michael D. Mehta, Lanham, Maryland, USA, Lexington Books, 2005, .
 The Politics of CANDU Exports, by Duane Bratt, Toronto, University of Toronto Press, 2006, .
 

1908 births
1987 deaths
Canadian physicists
Canadian nuclear physicists
Canadian Commanders of the Order of the British Empire
Fellows of the Royal Society
Fellows of the Royal Society of Canada
Companions of the Order of Canada
People from Cumberland
Academic staff of the Queen's University at Kingston
Enrico Fermi Award recipients
Royal Medal winners
Atoms for Peace Award recipients
Alumni of Gonville and Caius College, Cambridge